Vanessa (1868) is a painting by John Everett Millais in Sudley House, Liverpool. It is a fancy portrait depicting Jonathan Swift's  close friend and correspondent Esther Vanhomrigh (1688–1723), who was known by that nickname, which Swift himself invented for her.

Vanessa represents a major departure in Millais's art because he abandons fully for the first time the detailed finish that was still to be seen in Waking and Sleeping, exhibited in the previous year. Influenced by the work of Diego Velázquez and Joshua Reynolds, Millais paints with dramatic, visible brush strokes in vivid colours, creating what has been described as an "almost violently modern" handling of paint.

Esther Vanhomrigh is known as "Swift's Vanessa" because of the fictional name he gave her when he published their correspondence. The portrait is wholly imaginary. No  image of Esther Vanhomrigh  survives and we  know very little about her actual appearance, although she was said "not to be a beauty". She is holding a letter, presumably written to or from Swift. Her sad expression is related to the fraught nature of the relationship, which was broken up by Swift's relationship with another woman, Esther Johnson, whom he called "Stella", and whom he may have married secretly.  Vanessa died soon afterwards from tuberculosis.  Millais also painted a companion piece depicting Stella.

The painting is part of the 18th century revival in British art at this time, when a renewed interest in the brushwork of Reynolds and Gainsborough was emerging.

Notes

Paintings by John Everett Millais
1868 paintings
Paintings in Liverpool